Anthony William "Nick" Winter (25 August 1894 – 6 May 1955) was an Australian sportsman. He won the gold medal in the triple jump at the 1924 Summer Olympics in Paris, in the process setting a new world record. His medal-winning jump remained an Australian record until 1960.

Early life
Winter was born on 25 August 1894 in Brocklesby, New South Wales, the son of Sarah Ann (née Boyton) and Anthony Winter. His father was a fettler. He attended a local public school and subsequently worked as a labourer. In 1915, Winter enlisted in the Australian Imperial Force. He served in Egypt with the 7th Light Horse Regiment and in France with the Australian Army Service Corps. He returned to Australia in June 1919 and from December 1920 worked as a fireman in Manly.

Sporting career
Winter was a member of several amateur athletics clubs in Sydney. The previous record had stood since 1911. Winter's record-breaking jump was set barefoot, as he had badly bruised his heels on a previous attempt. It was his third and last jump in the final, and came after he had fouled on the previous jump. His jump remained an Australian record until 1960.

Winter was one of three gold medallists from Manly in 1924, along with Boy Charlton and Dick Eve. His event was not widely contested in Australia at the time and was not yet included in the Australian Athletics Championships. Winter returned at the 1928 Summer Olympics at the age of 33, but placed 12th in the triple jump. In 1930, aged 35, he was the inaugural Australian triple jump champion, also finishing runner-up in 1932 in his last competition.

Outside of the triple jump, Winter was a talented all-round sportsman, participating in rugby league, cricket, tennis, golf, wrestling, and solo tug-of-war. He was a talented billiards player and was the runner-up in the New South Wales state championships in 1927.

Later life
Winter left the fire service in 1927. He later ran a tobacconist's shop and managed billiards halls in George Street and Pitt Street, Sydney. According to The Canberra Times, he was "well known in Canberra, having conducted a hairdressing saloon at Kingston for several years".

Death
Winter was found dead in the bathroom of his home in Pagewood on 7 May 1955. It was reported that police believed he had a heart attack while attempting to light a gas water heater, and that "he died either from the heart attack or from gas poisoning". A coronial inquest found that he died of carbon monoxide poisoning and returned an open verdict. His son regarded suicide as unlikely.

Honours
Winter was inducted into the Sport Australia Hall of Fame in 1986.

See also
 Triple jump world record progression

References

External links
 ADB biography
Profile
Athletics Australia

1894 births
1955 deaths
Australian male triple jumpers
Olympic gold medalists for Australia
Athletes (track and field) at the 1924 Summer Olympics
Athletes (track and field) at the 1928 Summer Olympics
Olympic athletes of Australia
World record setters in athletics (track and field)
Medalists at the 1924 Summer Olympics
Olympic gold medalists in athletics (track and field)
Accidental deaths in New South Wales
Deaths from carbon monoxide poisoning
Australian firefighters
Australian military personnel of World War I
Sport Australia Hall of Fame inductees